"Our Friend the Atom" is a 1957 episode of the television series Disneyland describing the benefits of nuclear power and hosted by Heinz Haber. It was part of the publicity campaign for peaceful uses of atomic energy, following Dwight D. Eisenhower's "Atoms for Peace" speech at the UN General Assembly in December 1953. The episode was broadcast on January 23, 1957, and repeated on April 24 of the same year.

In 1956, Golden Press published a children's book, The Walt Disney Story of Our Friend the Atom, using artwork from the show.

Educational film
In 1980, an updated version called The Atom: A Closer Look was released by Disney's educational media division.

Production team

Animation 

 Jack Boyd
 Cliff Nordberg
 John Lounsbery
 Jack Campbell
 Jack Buckley
 Ed Parks

Animation Art Styling 

 Claude Coats
 John Hench

Layout 

 Al Zinnen
 Thor Putnam

Backgrounds 

 Jimi Trout
 Irv Wyner

Special Processes 

 Ub Iwerks
 Eustace Lycett

Home media
The episode was released on May 18, 2004 on Walt Disney Treasures: Tomorrow Land.

References

External links 
 

Walt Disney anthology television series episodes
1957 American television episodes
Documentary films about nuclear technology
Television episodes directed by Hamilton Luske